Est 4003 to 4175 was a class of 173 French compound 2-8-0 locomotives built in the early years of the 20th century for the Chemins de fer de l'Est. They were built to handle the increasing output of the steel industry in the Lorraine area.

Origins 
The locomotives were developments of the prototypes 4001 et 4002 which had been built for the Est by Société alsacienne de constructions mécaniques (SACM) in 1902. They were built in three batches, with the first two built by the Est's Épernay Works, and the third built by the various private contractors:

 The first series, 4003 to 4017, entered service in 1905–1906 and were identical to the prototypes 4001 and 4002.
 The second series, 4018 to 4070, entered service between 1907 and 1909 and only differed from the first batch due to alterations in the steam passages.
 The third and last series, 4071 to 4175, were delivered between 1911 and 1914 and were fitted with a 21-element Schmidt superheater.

Description 
The Consolidations were four-cylinder compound locomotives with Walschaerts valve gear.  They were provided with a Belpaire firebox, Adams piston valves, and an Est-type horizontal regulator.

Tenders 
These tenders were gradually assigned to the earlier locomotives.

Usage and services 
They became the Est's standard heavy 2-8-0 freight locomotive and were designed to haul heavy trains. They were allocated to many of the depots in Eastern France, like Nancy, Bar-le-Duc, Reims, Troyes, Saint-Dizier, Vesoul, Belfort, Châlons, and others. They could pull a  train at  up a 20.0 to 22.5 per mille (2.00 to 2.25 percent / 1 in 50 to 1 in 44.4) grade.

All were still in service at nationalisation, and they were renumbered by the SNCF as 1-140.A.3 to 1-140.A.175.

Between 1932 and 1946 several were rebuilt with larger steam passages, a 6-jet exhaust system and smoke deflectors. These "Chapelonised" locomotives were reclassified from A to C by the SNCF.

They became the Est's standard heavy 2-8-0 freight locomotive
Being a standard Est locomotive class, they stayed in service until they were replaced by the SNCF 141R class locomotives during the period 1948–1951. All were withdrawn by 1954 and none were preserved.

Characteristics 

 Overall length (loco only): 
 Maximum theoretical tractive effort:  (4003 – 4070),  (4071 – 4175)
 Maximum practical tractive effort:

Tender

 Length of tender:  (4091 – 4175)
 Length of loco and tender:  (4091 – 4175)

References 

 
 
 
 

004003
2-8-0 locomotives
Steam locomotives of France
Railway locomotives introduced in 1905
Standard gauge locomotives of France
Henschel locomotives
Sächsische Maschinenfabrik locomotives
Fives-Lille locomotives
Compound locomotives
ANF locomotives
Freight locomotives